Iowa County is the name of two counties in the United States:
Iowa County, Iowa 
Iowa County, Wisconsin